The Railways Department is a proposed Hong Kong government department. The Railway Development Office of the Highways Department and the Railways Branch of the Electrical and Mechanical Services Department would be merged into the new department, which would be subordinate to the Transport and Housing Bureau.

The government proposed the new department in response to recent high-profile railway safety scandals in Hong Kong, such as the problems surrounding the construction of the enlarged Hung Hom station. The commission of inquiry formed to investigate the Hung Hom situation was critical of the Highways Department for failing to properly monitor the project.

Establishment of the department is planned for 2023.

References

Hong Kong government departments and agencies
Proposed organizations
Rail transport in Hong Kong